Sukkertoppen means "the Sugar Loaf" in Danish and Norwegian. It may refer to:
Maniitsoq, formerly Sukkertoppen or Nye-Sukkertoppen, a town in mid-western Greenland.
Kangaamiut, Greenland, the original site of Sukkertoppen before it was moved to the location of present-day Maniitsoq in 1782
Kirkjufell, a mountain west of Grundarfjörður in Iceland.
Sukkertoppen, a mountain in Ålesund, Norway.